Partners is a 1979 album by Scherrie & Susaye released on Motown Records.  Following the disbanding of The Supremes in 1977, former group members Scherrie Payne and Susaye Greene recorded the album, sharing songwriting, arranging and production duties.  Legendary performer Ray Charles features on "Love Bug" whilst Joyce Vincent Wilson (formerly of Tony Orlando and Dawn) is featured on background vocals.

"Leaving Me Was the Best Thing You've Ever Done" was released as the album's only single. In 2014, the album was re-released on CD and to digital music stores and online streaming services.

Critical reception

In an Allmusic review, Ed Hogan noted 'the overall smooth, intelligent tone of the album', describing Partners as 'a quiet storm precursor'. Hogan expressed "Luvbug" featuring Ray Charles is 'thick and funky' and 'sophisticated slow jams like "You've Been Good to Me," "Another Life From Now," and mellow treats like "In the Night" and "Your Sweet Love" were ahead of their time'. Meanwhile, "Leaving Me Was the Best Thing You've Ever Done" and "I Found Another Love" 'satisfy their dance fans'.

A contemporary Billboard review praised Scherrie & Susaye's 'strong, soulful' vocals and described the album as an 'interesting, if occasionally uneven, package of mostly upbeat songs', citing "Storybook Romance", "Your Sweet Love" and "Luvbug" as the 'best cuts'.

Dusty Groove favorably reviewed Partners as a 'surprisingly great album' that is 'not the usual 70s bag from Motown', with Eugene McDaniels' production providing 'a hipper spin than some of the girls' more famous work from before!' Dusty Groove also noted 'a slight Minnie Riperton touch to the vocals a times – a really great sense of range – and the best tracks have a warm modern soul vibe that really lets the girls move forward strongly, especially at the few points when there's an undercurrent of funk.'

In an interview with Blues & Soul, Payne recounted " I remember first meeting Luther Vandross. We were at a session. Quincy Jones called Susaye and me into a session with Luther, James Ingram, and I can't remember who else [...] Luther was so excited to meet Susaye and me, and when he said he loved Partners and just when on and on about it, it really made me feel good.

Track listing
Adapted from Discogs and Apple Music.

Out-takes
Several tracks recorded during the sessions for 'Partners' did not make the final cut.  These include "We'll Get By", "The Fantasy", "Slow Dance".

Personnel
Adapted from Discogs.

Musicians

Backing Vocals – Scherrie Payne, Susaye Greene-Brown, Allen L. Greene III, Bill Champlin, Carmen Twillie (Arranger), Ed Brown, Gene McDaniels, Jim Gilstrap, Joyce Vincent-Wilson, Kathy Collier, Roy Galloway, Venette Gloud
Baritone Saxophone, Tenor Saxophone – Kim Hutchcroft
Bass – Abraham Laboriel, Ed Brown (tracks: "Your Sweet Love", "Luvbug", "In The Night")
Drums – Steve Schaeffer
Electric Piano [Fender Rhodes], Piano [Acoustic] – Leon Pendarvis, Randy Waldman
Guitar – Alan Silvestri, Jeff Mironov
Percussion – Paulinho Da Costa
Piano [Acoustic], Synthesizer, Clavinet, Keyboards [Arp] – Odell Brown, Susaye Greene-Brown ("When The Day Comes Every Night")
Synthesizer – Craig Hundley
Tenor Saxophone – Gary Herbig
Tenor Saxophone, Alto Saxophone, Flute – Larry Williams
Trombone [Alto], Bass Trombone, Tenor Saxophone – William Reichenbach
Trumpet, Flugelhorn – Gary Grant, Jerry Hey

Technical

Arranger, Co-Producer – Scherrie Payne, Susaye Greene-Brown
Co-producer – Ed Brown
Concertmaster – Gerald Vinci, Bill Nuttycombe
Coordinator [Production, Assistant] – Lori Nadlman
Coordinator [Production] – Cyndi James-Reese
Engineer [Assistant] – Bill Battrell, Bill Stern, Bino Espinoza, James Warmack
Executive-Producer – Suzanne de Passe Le Mat
Mastered By – John Matousek, Russ Terrana
Mixed By – Milt Calice, Russ Terrana
Producer – Eugene McDaniels
Product Manager – Suzanne Coston
Recorded By – Milt Calice

Artwork

Art Direction – John Cabalka
Calligraphy [Lettering] – Vigon Nahas Vigon
Design – Ginny Livingston
Photography By – Claude Mougin

Singles
"Leaving Me Was the Best Thing You've Ever Done" b/w "When the Day Comes Every Night" (US, CAN - Motown 1473), (UK - TMG 1167), (PRT - IM-26010)

References

1979 albums
Motown albums
Rhythm and blues albums by American artists